Lorne Campbell may refer to:
 Lorne Campbell (ice hockey) (1879–1957), Canadian ice hockey player
 Lorne Campbell (art historian) (born 1946), Scottish art historian
 Lorne Argyle Campbell (1871–1947), businessman and political figure in British Columbia
 Lorne MacLaine Campbell (1902–1991), Scottish recipient of the Victoria Cross
 A. Lorne Campbell (1920–2014), Canadian lawyer and president of the Canadian Bar Association
 Lorne Edgar Campbell (1948-), Canadian outlaw biker.

See also
 Alastair Lorne Campbell of Airds (born 1937), Scottish officer of arms and author
 John Lorne Campbell (1906–1996), Scottish historian, farmer, environmentalist and folklore scholar
 Lorne Campbell Webster (1871–1941), financier and political figure in Quebec